"U Can't Touch This" is a song co-written, produced, and performed by American rapper MC Hammer. It was released as the third single from his third album, Please Hammer Don't Hurt 'Em (1990), and has been considered his signature song. Along with Hammer, Rick James shares songwriting credits with Alonzo Miller, as the song samples the prominent opening riff of James' 1981 single "Super Freak". The song has been used and referred to in many television shows, films, commercials, and other forms of media. It has also received multiple awards and recognition.

The song is notable as the winner of a Grammy Award for Best R&B Song and a Grammy Award for Best Rap Solo Performance. It was the first rap song to be nominated for a Grammy Award for Record of the Year at the 33rd Annual Grammy Awards in 1991, as well as the MTV Video Music Award for Best Rap Video and MTV Video Music Award for Best Dance Video at the 1990 MTV Video Music Awards. It peaked at number one on the Billboard Hot R&B/Hip-Hop Singles & Tracks chart, and charted in several countries.

Production and sales
The song samples the prominent opening riff of the Rick James song "Super Freak", which is repeated throughout the recording. The lyrics describe Hammer as having "toured around the world, from London to The Bay" and as being "magic on the mic", which he says coincides with James's "beat that you can't touch". Additionally, the lyrics "you can't touch this" and "Stop! Hammer time!" became pop culture catchphrases. Hammertime was later used as the title of a reality show starring Hammer on A&E during the summer of 2009.

The sample of "Super Freak", which forms the basis of the song, led James (and other performers on the original record) to file a lawsuit for copyright infringement, which was settled out of court, with Hammer agreeing to credit James as a songwriter, effectively granting him millions of dollars in royalties.

In late 1989, the song was first performed publicly on an episode of The Arsenio Hall Show.

The song was not initially released as a single. As a result, the album went on to sell more than 18 million copies, gaining multi-platinum certification from the Recording Industry Association of America.

Chart performance
In April 1990, the song hit the Top 40. It also secured a Grammy Award for Best R&B Song and a Grammy Award for Best Rap Solo Performance in 1991, a new category at the time, and the first rap song to be nominated for Grammy Award for Record of the Year. The single was a major success, reaching number one on the US Billboard Hot R&B/Hip-Hop Singles & Tracks chart and number eight on the Billboard Hot 100. The track also performed successfully in other parts of the world, peaking at number one in Australia, Netherlands, New Zealand and Sweden, and number 3 on the UK Singles Chart.

In September 1990, the music video for the song won a MTV Video Music Award for Best Rap Video and a MTV Video Music Award for Best Dance Video. It was also nominated for MTV Video Music Award for Best Male Video, Best Editing, and Best Choreography. In 1991, Kids Incorporated covered the song in the season 7 episode "Pipe Dreams".

Critical reception
Bill Coleman from Billboard commented, "A Rick James classic paired with Hammer's distinctive rhyme styling has added up to a deserved smash." Whitney Pastorek from Entertainment Weekly wrote, "The good-natured boast, laid over the hook of Rick James' 'Superfreak', proved irresistible. Hammer's hydraulic dance moves and outlandish fashions — harem pants and gold lamé, together at last! — were cartoonish". Ben Thompson  from NME said, "Currently more popular than sliced bread in the US of A, MC Hammer updates one of the more favoured moments of the dreadful Rick James in a barrage of twiddly synths. The debt that Swingbeat owes to Landscape's 'Einstein a Go-Go' has yet to be fully investigated."

Impact and legacy
In 1999, MTV's 100 Greatest Videos Ever Made included the song at number 71. In October 2000, VH1's 100 Greatest Dance Songs included it at number 88. In May 2001, VH1's 100 Greatest Videos included it at number 59.

In August 2005, the song was certified gold. In December 2007, VH1's 100 Greatest Songs of the '90s included it at number 16. During 2008, it ranked as number 26 on VH1's 100 Greatest Songs of Hip Hop.

In October 2005, Blender ranked the song at number 196 in their list of Greatest Songs Since You Were Born.

Music video
A music video, directed by Rupert Wainwright, was produced to promote the single, showing Hammer doing some of his signature dances, including the "running man", "the bump", and the "Hammer dance", while wearing his iconic Hammer pants. 

As of October 2022, the video has over 740 million views on YouTube.

Charts

Weekly charts

Year-end charts

Decade-end charts

Certifications and sales

Release history

Notable parodies
In 1991, a parody entitled "I Can't Watch This" was released by "Weird Al" Yankovic for his album Off the Deep End, with lyrics complaining about bad TV shows overlaid on the song's music track (and featuring samples of various commercials during the breakdowns).

Before the  NFL season started, the Miami Dolphins parodied the song as "U Can't Touch Us".

Childersburg High School Principal Quentin Lee in Childersburg, Alabama created a parody video to "share some joy" and provide advice to students on handling the COVID-19 pandemic.

The Go Jetters show parodied this song as a commercial for their show, only to be more show-related and be called "Can't Glitch This"

See also
Jingle Bells/U Can't Touch This – Crazy Frog cover
List of number-one singles in Australia during the 1990s
List of number-one singles from the 1990s (New Zealand)
List of Dutch Top 40 number-one singles of 1990
List of European number-one hits of 1990
List of number-one R&B singles of 1990 (U.S.)
List of number-one singles and albums in Sweden
List of RPM number-one dance singles of 1990

References

External links

U Can't Touch This at AllMusic

1990 singles
1990 songs
Capitol Records singles
Dutch Top 40 number-one singles
European Hot 100 Singles number-one singles
Grammy Award for Best Rap Solo Performance
MC Hammer songs
Number-one singles in Australia
Number-one singles in New Zealand
Number-one singles in Sweden
Songs written by Rick James
Songs written by MC Hammer
Quotations from music
1990 neologisms
Songs involved in plagiarism controversies
Quotations from hip hop music
Novelty and fad dances